The president of the University of Michigan is a constitutional officer who serves as the principal executive officer of the University of Michigan. The president is chosen by the Board of Regents of the University of Michigan, as provided for in the Constitution of the State of Michigan. Fifteen people—fourteen men and one woman—have held the office, in addition to several others who have held it in either an acting or interim capacity.

The University of Michigan's current president is Santa Ono, formerly the president of the University of British Columbia in Canada. He took office on 14 October 2022.

History 

The office was created by the Michigan Constitution of 1850, which also specified that the president was to be appointed by the Regents of the University of Michigan and preside at their meetings, but without a vote. The precise wording has evolved through subsequent state constitutions, and as of November 2018 the office is defined by Article VIII, section 5 of the Constitution of 1963: 

Between the establishment of the University of Michigan in 1837 and 1850, the Board of Regents ran the university directly; by law, they were supposed to appoint a chancellor to administer the university, but they never did, and a rotating roster of professors carried out the day-to-day administrative duties instead.

While the modern office was created in 1850, the University of Michigan itself now traces its date of founding to 1817, when its precursor, the University of Michigania, was founded. The only president of that institution, Rev. John Monteith, appears in the list of presidents but is not officially considered to have been a president of the University of Michigan.

List of University of Michigan presidents 

The first president of the university was Henry Philip Tappan. The position had originally been offered to Henry Barnard, but he declined, and Tappan and John Hiram Lathrop (then Chancellor of the University of Wisconsin–Madison) were nominated as new choices, after which Tappan was unanimously elected. Barnard later succeeded Lathrop at Wisconsin.

The 15th and most recent president of the university is Santa Ono, appointed in 2022. 
Of the previous presidents: 
 1 had the office abolished
 1 died in office
 2 were removed by the regents
 5 retired at the end of their careers
 2 resigned to return to teaching or research
 4 resigned to take posts at other institutions (Northwestern University, the Corporation for Public Broadcasting, Princeton University, and Columbia University)

Source:

Notes

References 
 
 
 
 
 
 
 

Michigan